Micropterix jacobella is a species of moth belonging to the family Micropterigidae. It was described by Walsingham, Lord Thomas de Grey, in 1901. It is known from Morocco and Tunisia and is probably also present in Algeria.

The wingspan is about 7.5 mm.

References

Micropterigidae
Moths described in 1901